The 1972–73 season was the 71st in the history of the Western Football League.

The champions for the first time in their history were Devizes Town.

League table
The league was increased from fourteen clubs to sixteen after Bideford, Dorchester Town and Minehead joined the Southern League, and five new clubs joined:

Ashtonians United
Avon Bradford
Bristol City Colts, rejoining the league after leaving in 1971.
Exeter City Reserves, rejoining the league after leaving in 1968.
Mangotsfield United (not the original Mangotsfield club which was a league member during the 1890s)

References

1972-73
5